Discovering Yourself is an EP from French soprano Emma Shapplin. The songs on the EP were later included on re-issues of Shapplin's album Carmine Meo.

Track listing
Discovering Yourself
Cuerpo Sin Alma [Remix]
Fera Ventura
Dolce Veneno

External links

Emma Shapplin albums
1999 EPs